"The Golden Boy" is a song recorded by Queen frontman Freddie Mercury together with Spanish operatic soprano Montserrat Caballé.

Overview
Originally included in the 1988 album Barcelona, the song was released as a 45 rpm two weeks after its appearance in the main album, with another excerpt from the LP, "The Fallen Priest", as the B-side. An instrumental version of the song was included in both the 12" vinyl and the 5" CD single releases. The single reached #86 in the UK Singles Chart.

Personnel
Freddie Mercury - vocals, piano, arrangements
Montserrat Caballe - vocals
Mike Moran - keyboards, programming, arrangements
Madeline Bell - backing vocals
Dennis Bishop - backing vocals
Lance Ellington - backing vocals
Miriam Stockley - backing vocals
Peter Straker - backing vocals
Mark Williamson - backing vocals
Carol Woods - backing vocals

Releases and track listing

Videoclip
The song's music video is footage of the artists' miming performance at the open air "La Nit" festival in Barcelona on 8 October 1988 (Mercury's last live performance before his illness got worse), where the song was performed along with "Barcelona" and "How Can I Go On". The video was first released as part of a 5" CD video single.

See also
Barcelona (album)

References 

1988 songs
Freddie Mercury songs
Songs written by Freddie Mercury
Songs written by Michael Moran (music producer)
Male–female vocal duets
Polydor Records singles
Songs with lyrics by Tim Rice